Oncopygius is a genus of flies in the family Dolichopodidae.

Species
Oncopygius distans (Loew, 1857)
Oncopygius formosus Parent, 1927
†Oncopygius gracilior Statz, 1940
Oncopygius magnificus Loew, 1873
†Oncopygius oligocaenicus Statz, 1940
†Oncopygius venustus Statz, 1940

References

Europe

Dolichopodidae genera
Neurigoninae
Asilomorph flies of Europe
Taxa named by Josef Mik